CIP may refer to:

Business and finance

 Commercially Important Person
 Construction in progress, a balance sheet assets item
 Continual improvement process
 "Carriage and Insurance Paid to" Incoterms
 Customer Identification Program, in US anti-money laundering

Government and military
 Capital improvement plan, in urban planning
 Citizen Information Project in the UK
 Classification of Instructional Programs, US Department of Education
 Commercial Import Program, US-South Vietnam
 Competitiveness and Innovation Framework Programme of the EU
 Combat Identification Panel, a US identify-friend-or-foe device
 Continuation in Part in US Patent law
 Corps of Intelligence Police of US Army 1917-1941
 Critical Infrastructure Protection, US
 Customer Identification Program, in US anti-money laundering

Organizations and businesses

 Canadian Institute of Planners
 California Innocence Project, for innocent prisoners
 Center for Industrial Progress think tank, San Diego, California, US
 Center for Islamic Pluralism, Washington D.C., US
 Centro Internacional de la Papa, the International Potato Center in Peru
 Center for Intellectual Property Studies, Gothenburg, Sweden
 Centre for Integrated Photonics
 Center for International Policy, Washington D.C, US
 Commission Internationale Permanente pour l'Epreuve des Armes à Feu Portatives (Permanent International Commission for the Proof of Small Arms)
 Comitato Italiano Paralimpico, Italian Paralympic Committee
 Crown International Pictures, US film studio
 Crippled Intellect Publications, a record label

Science and technology

Biology and medicine
 Calf-intestinal alkaline phosphatase, an enzyme
 Congenital insensitivity to pain
 Critical illness polyneuropathy
 CIP/KIP family of Cyclin-dependent kinase inhibitor proteins

Chemistry
 Cahn–Ingold–Prelog priority rules, or CIP system, for naming organic molecules
 Carbon in pulp, method of gold extraction
 Clean-in-place, without disassembly

Computing
 CIP-Tool, for modelling event-driven processes
 Common Indexing Protocol,  for exchanging index information
 Common Industrial Protocol, automation protocol
Core Independent Peripherals, an implementation of autonomous peripheral operations in microcontrollers

Other uses in science and technology 
Cataloging in Publication, data for a work, in library science
 Certified IRB Professional, a scientific research certification
 Cold isostatic pressing